The Supernova Cosmology Project is one of two research teams that determined the likelihood of an accelerating universe and therefore a positive cosmological constant,  using data from the redshift of Type Ia supernovae. The project is headed by Saul Perlmutter at Lawrence Berkeley National Laboratory, with members from Australia, Chile, France, Portugal, Spain, Sweden, the United Kingdom, and the United States.

This discovery was named "Breakthrough of the Year for 1998" by Science Magazine and, along with the High-z Supernova Search Team, the project team won the 2007 Gruber Prize in Cosmology and the 2015 Breakthrough Prize in Fundamental Physics. In 2011, Perlmutter was awarded the Nobel Prize in Physics for this work, alongside Adam Riess and Brian P. Schmidt from the High-z team.

Findings

Both the Super Cosmology Project and the High-Z Supernova Search Team, another team who was doing the same research, expected to find that the universe is either expanding then contracting as one way to explain the expanding universe idea or the universe must be expanding at a slow rate that will slow over time. However, in January 1998, the Supernova Cosmology project presented evidence that the expansion of the universe is not slowing at all and is in reality accelerating, citing Einstein's previously dismissed cosmological constant, Λ, which potentially includes up to 70% of the universe's total mass-energy density.

Theory validation

In order to determine what was happening to the universe, the researchers had to measure the speed of astronomical objects that are travelling away from us as well as how far away these objects actually are. In order to do any of this, the researchers had to find a standard light source that was bright enough to be seen with our telescopes due to the large distances away these objects would be. They chose to use Type Ia Supernovae, exploding stars, as their standard light source.

Methods

Type Ia supernovae are very bright standard candles, which makes it possible to calculate their distance to earth from the observed luminosity. Type Ia supernovae are rare in most galaxies, only occurring about two or three times in a thousand years. Before the Supernova Cosmology Project, it was difficult to find supernovae due to lesser telescopes. However, by scanning the night sky over individual periods of three weeks astronomers were able to find up to two dozen per session, giving them enough supernovae observations to conduct their study.

Project members
The team members are:
 Saul Perlmutter, Lawrence Berkeley National Laboratory
 Gregory Aldering, Lawrence Berkeley National Laboratory
 Brian J. Boyle, Australia Telescope National Facility
 Shane Burns, Colorado College
 Patricia G. Castro, Instituto Superior Técnico, Lisbon
 Warrick Couch, Swinburne University of Technology
 Susana Deustua, American Astronomical Society
 Richard Ellis, California Institute of Technology
 Sebastien Fabbro, Instituto Superior Técnico, Lisbon
 Alexei Filippenko, University of California, Berkeley (later a member of the High-z Supernova Search Team)
 Andrew Fruchter, Space Telescope Science Institute
 Gerson Goldhaber, Lawrence Berkeley National Laboratory
 Ariel Goobar, University of Stockholm
 Donald Groom, Lawrence Berkeley National Laboratory
 Isobel Hook, University of Oxford
 Mike Irwin, University of Cambridge
 Alex Kim, Lawrence Berkeley National Laboratory
 Matthew Kim
 Robert Knop, Vanderbilt University
 Julia C. Lee, Harvard University
 Chris Lidman, European Southern Observatory
 Thomas Matheson, NOAO Gemini Science Center
 Richard McMahon, University of Cambridge
 Richard Muller, University of California, Berkeley
 Heidi Newberg, Rensselaer Polytechnic Institute
 Peter Nugent, Lawrence Berkeley National Laboratory
 Nelson Nunes, University of Cambridge
 Reynald Pain, CNRS-IN2P3, Paris
 Nino Panagia, Space Telescope Science Institute
 Carl Pennypacker, University of California, Berkeley
 Robert Quimby, The University of Texas
 Pilar Ruiz-Lapuente, University of Barcelona
 Bradley E. Schaefer, Louisiana State University
 Nicholas Walton, University of Cambridge

References

External links 
Supernova Cosmology Project Mainsite

Supernovae